The 1974 Nippon Professional Baseball season was the 25th season of operation for the league.

Regular season standings

Central League

Pacific League

Pacific League Playoff
The Pacific League teams with the best first and second-half records met in a best-of-five playoff series to determine the league representative in the Japan Series.

Lotte Orions won the series 3–0.

Japan Series

Lotte Orions won the series 4–2.

See also
1974 Major League Baseball season

References

1974 in baseball
1974 in Japanese sport